The Luncheon on the Grass is a 1979 Soviet musical two-part television film directed by Nikolai Alexandrovich based on the stories of Anatoly Chernousov.

The film is titled after the painting Le Déjeuner sur l’herbe / The Luncheon on the Grass by Claude Monet from the album of the Impressionists, presented to young cartoonist-surrealist Dima Murashkin by Pioneer leader Ivan Kovalyov.

Plot
Graduate Ivan Nikolayevich Kovalev is preparing to enter the institute. His friend Sergei Pavlovich convinces Ivan to engage in this training in the pioneer camp as a pioneer leader, where there is plenty of free time and sun. Ivan agrees, but after a few days he regrets very much about his decision: the pioneers smoke constantly and ignore the daily schedule, and there is no peace and quiet for studying.

Only the experienced teacher, pioneer Alexander Petrovna, is capable of dealing with them. On top of that, a group of guys run from the camp to the forest, where they bake potatoes in the ashes and sing songs. For this they are threatened with getting expelled from the pioneer camp. Ivan decides to postpone his studies, take bail for children and join the pioneer life. He takes part on an equal footing in the daily life of his detachment and gains authority.

Cast

Lead roles 
Sergei Prokhanov – Ivan Nikolayevich Kovalev, Pioneer Leader
Valentina Talyzina – Anna Petrovna, a teacher in the pioneer camp
Tatyana Lebedkova – Irina, Pioneer Leader
Lyudmila Graves – Lusia Pinigina, a girl with a low content of hemoglobin, who loves fairy tales and books (voiced by Glagoleva, Vera Vitalevna, Vera Glagoleva)
Maxim Shirokov – Dima Murashkin, the white crow / pessimistic surrealist who paints cartoons
Alexander Koptev – Yura Shiryaev
Igor Knyazev – Mukhanov
Alexander Zhdanov – Anokhin
Tatyana Samsonova – fashionista
Aleksandr Demyanenko – Vasily Vasilievich, the head of the pioneer camp (voiced by Boris Ivanov)
Gennady Yalovich – Filimonov, a teacher of physical education in the pioneer camp
Vladimir Novikov – Sergei Pavlovitch, Senior Pioneer Leader (voiced by Aleksandr Belyavsky)
Irina Yurevich – Zoya

Episodic roles 
 Ekaterina Inozemtseva
 Pavel Kozlovsky
 Larisa Kronberg – neighbor of Ivan (1st part)
 Elena Kozlitina – doctor (1st part)
 Ilya Rutberg – manager (1st part)
 Valentina Telegina – aunt Pasha, a cook in the pioneer camp (voiced by Elena Maksimova)
 Yuri Prokhorov (2nd part)
 Grigory Shpigel (2nd part)
 Children's choreographic collective of the State Academic Folk Dance Ensemble of the USSR under the guidance of Igor Moiseyev

Vocal parts 
 Yevgeny Golovin
 Galina Lushina
 Children's Choir of the Bolshoi Theater

References

External links

Soviet musical films
1970s musical films
Studio Ekran films
Soviet television films
1979 films
1970s Russian-language films

Films based on short fiction